Patrick McMahon (1813 – 19 December 1875) was an Irish Liberal, Independent Irish Party, and Radical politician.

McMahon was first elected as one of the two Members of Parliament (MPs) for County Wexford as a Radical at the 1852 general election but shortly after joined the Independent Irish Party when it formed later that year. He held the seat until 1865, being re-elected as an Independent Irish Party candidate in 1857, and then as a Liberal Party candidate, upon its creation, in 1859.

He was later elected MP as a Liberal candidate for New Ross in the 1868 general election and held the seat until 1874 when he stood down.

References

External links
 

1813 births
1875 deaths
Irish Liberal Party MPs
Members of the Parliament of the United Kingdom for County Wexford constituencies (1801–1922)
UK MPs 1852–1857
UK MPs 1857–1859
UK MPs 1859–1865
UK MPs 1868–1874